Sunburnt is an album by Martin Phillipps and The Chills, though more correctly by Martin Phillipps alone. Owing to visa problems, the usual Chills line-up were not able to take part in the recording sessions, and session musicians Dave Gregory and Dave Mattacks appeared on all tracks, with Phillipps handling vocal, keyboard, and guitar parts, as well as some of the percussion. Craig Leon, the album's producer, also appeared on several of the tracks.

The album was recorded at Doghouse Studios in Oxfordshire in August and September 1995, and mixed and mastered at Rockfield Studios in Wales and Townhouse Studios in London. It was released by Flying Nun Records in 1996.

Critical reception
Trouser Press wrote that it "lacks the drive of the best of the band’s singles." Alternative Rock called it a "solid, but not too memorable collection scarred by the inadvertent loss of [Phillipps's] entire band."

Track listing
All tracks written by Martin Phillipps.
"As Far as I Can See" – 3:28
"Premonition" – 2:54
"Surrounded" – 2:48
"Come Home" – 3:09
"Sunburnt" – 3:42
"The Big Assessment" – 2:59
"Swimming in the Rain" – 3:38
"Dreams Are Free" – 2:07
"You Can Understand Me" – 3:20
"Lost in Future Ruins" – 3:10
"New Millennium" – 3:29
"Walk on the Beach" – 2:38
"Secret Garden" – 3:07

Two singles were released from the album — "Come Home" and "Surrounded".

References

1996 albums
The Chills albums
Flying Nun Records albums